Francis Scott, 2nd Earl of Buccleuch (21 December 1626 – 22 November 1651) was a Scottish peer. He was the son of Walter Scott, 1st Earl of Buccleuch and his wife, Lady Mary Hay, daughter of Francis Hay, 9th Earl of Erroll. Upon the death of his father in 1633, Scott succeeded to the earldom of Buccleuch. On 25 July 1646, he married Lady Margaret Leslie, daughter of John Leslie, 6th Earl of Rothes.

They had four children:
Mary Scott, 3rd Countess of Buccleuch (1647–1661)
Walter Scott, Baron Scott of Buccleuch (1648, died in infancy)
Lady Margaret Scott (1650-1652)
Anne Scott, 1st Duchess of Buccleuch (1651–1732)

References

1626 births
1651 deaths
Earls of Buccleuch
Francis
Members of the Parliament of Scotland 1648–1651
17th-century Scottish peers